František Provazník (born 7 February 1948 in Prague) is a Czech rower who competed for Czechoslovakia in the 1972 Summer Olympics. He is also known as a photographer.

In 1972 he was a crew member of the Czechoslovak boat which won the bronze medal in the coxed four event.

References

1948 births
Living people
Czech male rowers
Czechoslovak male rowers
Olympic rowers of Czechoslovakia
Rowers at the 1972 Summer Olympics
Olympic bronze medalists for Czechoslovakia
Olympic medalists in rowing
Photographers from Prague
Rowers from Prague
Medalists at the 1972 Summer Olympics
European Rowing Championships medalists